USS Jane II (SP-1188) was a United States Navy patrol vessel in commission from 1917 to 1918.

Jane II was built as a private wooden motorboat of the same name in 1914 by A. Appel at Trenton, New Jersey. In August 1917, the U.S. Navy acquired her from her owner, George Gumphert of Philadelphia, Pennsylvania, for use as a section patrol boat during World War I. She was commissioned soon thereafter as USS Jane II (SP-1188).

Assigned to the 4th Naval District and based at Cape May, New Jersey, Jane II served as a patrol craft and dispatch boat through the end of World War I.

The Navy returned Jane II to Gumphert on 25 November 1918.

References

SP-1188 Jane II at Department of the Navy Naval History and Heritage Command Online Library of Selected Images: U.S. Navy Ships -- Listed by Hull Number: "SP" #s and "ID" #s -- World War I Era Patrol Vessels and other Acquired Ships and Craft numbered from SP-1100 through SP-1199
NavSource Online: Section Patrol Craft Photo Archive Jane II (SP 1188)

Patrol vessels of the United States Navy
World War I patrol vessels of the United States
Ships built in New Jersey
1914 ships